Pedro Teixeira Castelo Airport , is the airport serving Tauá, Brazil.

Airlines and destinations
No scheduled flights operate at this airport.

Access

See also

List of airports in Brazil

References

External links

Airports in Ceará